Cyclohexene oxide is a cycloaliphatic epoxide. It can react in cationic polymerization to poly(cyclohexene oxide). As cyclohexene is monovalent, poly(cyclohexene oxide) is a thermoplastic.

Production 
Cyclohexene oxide is produced in epoxidation reaction from cyclohexene. The epoxidation can take place either in a homogeneous reaction by peracids or heterogeneous catalysis (e.g. silver and molecular oxygen).

In industrial production the heterogeneously catalyzed synthesis is preferred because of better atom economy, a simpler separation of the product and easier recycling of catalyst. A short overview and an investigation of the oxidation of cyclohexene by hydrogen peroxide is given in the literature. In recent times the catalytic oxidation of cyclohexene by (immobilized) metalloporphyrin complexes has been found to be an efficient way.

In laboratory, cyclohexene oxide can also be prepared by reacting cyclohexene with magnesium monoperoxyphthalate (MMPP) in a mixture of isopropanol and water as solvent at room temperature.

With this method, good yields up to 85 % can be reached.

Properties and reactions 
Cyclohexene has been studied extensively by analytical methods. Cyclohexene oxide can be polymerized in solution, catalyzed by a solid acid catalyst.

Application
One of the known uses is in the synthesis of bromadoline.

References 

Epoxides
Cyclic compounds